Grattan may refer to:

People

Given name
 Grattan Kerans (born 1941), American politician from Oregon
 Grattan O'Leary (1888–1976), journalist, publisher and member of the Canadian Senate
 Grattan H. Wheeler (1783–1852), U.S. Representative from New York

Surname
 C. Hartley Grattan (1902–1980), American economic analyst and historian
 Harry Grattan (c. 1867–1951), British stage actor, singer, dancer and writer
 Henry Grattan (1746–1820), Irish politician
 Henry Grattan (junior) (1789–1859), Irish politician
 Jennifer Grattan (born 1987), Canadian professional wrestler with the stage name "Portia Perez"
 John Grattan (naturalist) (1800–1871), Irish naturalist and anthropologist
 Michelle Grattan (born 1944), Australian journalist
 Thomas Colley Grattan (1792–1864), Irish writer
 William J. Grattan (1876–1938), New York politician

Places

United States 
 Grattan Township, Michigan
 Grattan Township, Minnesota
 Grattan Township, Holt County, Nebraska

Other
 Grattan Bridge, a road bridge spanning the River Liffey in Dublin, Ireland
 Grattan Institute, an Australian public-policy think tank
 Grattan massacre, 1854 incident between the U.S. army and the Brulé Lakota (Sioux) 
 Grattan plc, a British catalogue clothing retailer
 Grattan Stadium, sponsored name of Odsal Stadium, home of Bradford Bulls Rugby League Football Club, in Bradford, England